Rakesh Kumar Verma also known as Dr. R.K. Verma is a MLA for Raniganj constituency of Pratapgarh, Uttar Pradesh with the Samajwadi Party.

He hails from village Sarai Devrai post Katra Gulab Singh in Pratapgarh.

References

People from Pratapgarh district, Uttar Pradesh
Living people
Apna Dal politicians
Apna Dal (Sonelal) politicians
Uttar Pradesh MLAs 2017–2022
Year of birth missing (living people)
Bharatiya Janata Party politicians from Uttar Pradesh
Samajwadi Party politicians
Uttar Pradesh MLAs 2022–2027